Stefan Sauk (born Stefan Wernström, 6 June 1955) is a Swedish actor and comedian who has worked in film, television, and theatre since 1984.

Selected filmography

Film

Television

External links
 Stefan Sauk at the Swedish Film Institute
 Stefan Sauk at Malmö Theatre
 

1955 births
Living people
Swedish male actors
Swedish comedians
Recipients of the Order of Saint Lazarus (statuted 1910)